Ross Parker (born Albert Rostron Parker) (16 August 1914 – 1 August 1974) was an English pianist, composer, lyricist and actor. He is best known for co-writing the songs "We'll Meet Again" and "There'll Always Be an England".

Songwriting career 
Parker had a long and successful songwriting career which included chart hits from 1938 to 1970. In 1938 he was already considered one of England's "big five" songwriters. Horace Heidt's version of Parker's song "The Girl In The Blue Bonnet" reached number 15 on the Billboard charts in 1938. "I Won't Tell A Soul (I Love You)" was a number one hit for Andy Kirk and his Twelve Clouds of Joy, spending 12 weeks on the Billboard chart in 1939. Although "There'll Always Be an England" was released before the start of World War II, it became an enormous success when war was declared by Britain. Parker joined the British Army. He and Hughie Charles (his collaborator on "There'll Always Be an England" and "We'll Meet Again") continued to write patriotic songs such as "The Navy's Here" during the war.

Ross Parker wrote the original songs for several stage shows performed by The Crazy Gang at the Victoria Palace Theatre, London, in the early 1950s, including Knights of Madness, Ring out the Bells, Jokers Wild and These Foolish Kings.

In 1956, Shirley Bassey's manager Michael Sullivan commissioned Parker to write a song for the then 19-year-old Bassey. Parker wrote "Burn My Candle", which later became Bassey's first recording.

Parker wrote the lyrics for "A Song Of Joy", which was a hit for Miguel Rios.

Acting career
Parker made his on-screen debut in the British-American film by Albert R. Broccoli, Chitty Chitty Bang Bang, as Lord Scrumptious's chef. It was his only notable role in a blockbuster film. He appeared as French-Canadian detective sergeant Soustelle in "The Saint" season 2 episode "Judith".

Parker previously had appeared on stage in Paris, in 1955, in Pommes à l'Anglaise. He then performed in the revue La Plume de Ma Tante for several years, firstly at the Garrick Theatre in London from 1956 to 1958, then at the Royale Theatre, New York, from 1958 to 1960, after which the revue toured to Las Vegas, Los Angeles and San Francisco in 1961. Parker returned to the Théâtre des Variétés in Paris in 1965 to appear in this revue once again.

Musicals 
 Clown Jewels
 Happy as a King
 Knights of Madness
 La Plume de Ma Tante (English lyrics)

Discography 
 "The Happy Piano of Ross Parker" (NPL 18262)

References

External links 

 
 
 

1914 births
1974 deaths
20th-century British musicians
20th-century English male actors
English film actors
English lyricists
English musical theatre composers
English pianists
Musicians from Manchester
Tony Award winners
British Army personnel of World War II